Bhagini Nivedita is a 1962 Indian Bengali-language biographical film directed by Bijoy Basu. The story was based on the life of Sister Nivedita. It won the Best Feature Film award at the 9th National Film Awards.

Cast 
 Arundhati Devi as Sister Nivedita
 Asit Baran
 Ajit Banerjee
 Shobha Sen
 Dilip Roy
 Mumtaz Ahmed Khan as Mr. Wilson
 Sunanda Banerjee
 Haradhan Bannerjee
 Dwiju Bhawal
 Premangshu Bose
 Amaresh Das

References

External links 
 

Bengali-language Indian films
1962 films
Indian biographical films
Films about spirituality
Films about Hinduism
Sister Nivedita
Best Feature Film National Film Award winners
1960s Bengali-language films
1960s biographical films